Deh-e Pas Qalat (also Romanized as Deh-e Pas Qalāt and Deh-e Pas-e Qalāt; also known as Pas Qalāt) is a village in Bakesh-e Yek Rural District, in the Central District of Mamasani County, Fars Province, Iran. At the 2006 census, its population was 39, in 5 families.

References 

Populated places in Mamasani County